Donji Humac is one of the oldest settlements on the Croatian island of Brač, located on an inland hill. The top of the hill is marked by a widely visible baroque bell-tower. The nearby Kopačina cave has been inhabited more than 13,200 years ago. As of the 2011 census, Donji Humac has a population of 177 - far below its largest extent at the beginning of the 20th century with more than 500 people, before several waves of emigration depopulated the settlement.

The village is about one kilometre north-west of Nerežišća, and linked to Supetar, the largest city of Brač and its frequent ferries to Split, through a paved 6 km road northwards, mostly following state road D113. A county road (Ž6188) leads westwards to Dračevica, about 2.4 kilometres away.

To the south and west of the settlement are fertile fields, where traces of pre-Croatian habitation have been found. Some of these traces, such as Roman ornaments, have been incorporated into the houses of the settlement, such as the homes of the Dragičević and Laurić families.

Donji Humac is surrounded by a number of quarries. The local stone has given the settlement its distinct look very early on, and many of the old elements of the settlement are still preserved. The closeness to the quarries had also led to a tradition of artistic stonemasons in the village, which is carried on until present. In 1996, an international meeting of stonemasons lead to the creation of a number of monuments which are now spread throughout the settlement. Besides stone, the main sources of income have traditionally been wine, olives, cherries, sheep husbandry, and hunting, and more recently, tourism.

History 
It is assumed that in the 11th century, Donji Humac was called Gomilje or Gomirje and was already a settlement for a while. In 1080, a Brač person named Tišen bought from a Split aristocrat named Cassarias some houses and land in Gomilje. Gomilje lies on the western side of the Humac hill, just below Kis (from the Latin word ecclesia). A cloister and the oldest buildings of Donji Humac are expected to have been in Kis, close to the Smokvica pond.

The name Humac is mentioned in sources for the first time in 1305. The settlers are supposed to have come from the area of Saint Elias and Banje to the west of Humac. The name Donji Humac (literally translated as lower hillside) was only introduced later to differentiate it from Gornji Humac (literally upper hillside), which is on the eastern, more mountaineous side of Brač.

In medieval times, most of the population of Brač was living inland, as the coast was too dangerous due to pirate and other attacks. During that time, the northwest of the island belonged to Donji Humac, including the settlements Sutivan and Mirca - both of which are quite larger than Donji Humac today. In the 20th century, the worsening of the economic situation in Donji Humac - first through the grape phylloxera louse which destroyed several grape harvests and thus the wine production, later World War II and its aftermath - lead to several waves of emigration, leaving Donji Humac today with only a third or quarter of the population only a century ago.

Kopačina cave 

Cultural objects dug out from the cave of Kopačina (1 km to the north-west of Donji Humac) indicate human habitation since the stone age. The cave is about 12 meter long, and has two chambers.

Remains of wild horses, birds, deers, and bears were found, as well as stone knives, drills, arrow tips, and other mesolithic tools, among numerous mesolithic flint weapons, have been found in the front chamber. In the middle part of the cave, ceramics and an early Bronze Age axe have been found. In the back of the cave, human remains from the epipaleolithic and the mesolithic have been found. The radiolarite rock used for some of the objects found in the cave is not known to exist on the Dalmatian islands or the Dalmatian coast, and indicates connections to the Dalmatian hinterland, likely the mouth of the Neretva or the Budva region.

The cave was first explored by Frane Bulić in 1890. It used to be thought that the cave has been continuously inhabited since the late Upper Paleolithic through the Mesolithic until the Bronze Age, i.e. from the 8th to the 3rd millennium BC. More recent results indicate an even older original usage - before 13,200 BP (although it is unknown how long before) - but not continuously to the Bronze Age. That would make the findings in the cave possibly the oldest traces of human settlement not only on Brač but in all of Dalmatia.

Churches 

The parish church of Saint Fabian and Sebastian is on the top of Donji Humac and dominates the view on the hill with its widely visible baroque bell tower. Originally, there was a church here that old documents called Stomorica (Santa Maria). Linguistically, the name indicates that the church has been built in the 10th century. The altar has an inscription dated to 1175. In the 14th century, the church was expanded to double its previous size with romanesque arches. 1725-1742 the church was again expanded. The baroque bell tower and the two side ships of the church were added at that time, built by Ignac Macanović from Trogir. The churches organ was built in 1775 by Franco Dazzi.

The church hosts a fresco of Christ sitting on his throne between his mother and St John the Baptist, dating from the 13th century. The legend went that every year, on January 20, the day of St Fabian and Sebastian, dew would fall on the fresco, which lead to many pilgrims coming to Donji Humac. In the church, more than 250 votive offerings gathered over the centuries are on display. Later, the main pilgrimage to Donji Humac moved to July 26, the day of Saint Ana. Today the annual feast of Saint Ana includes a large celebration and the blessing of motor vehicles.

The old cemetery of Donji Humac is around the parish church (a new cemetery was opened in the 17th century on the western slope of the hill, with a small church dedicated to Our Lady of Carmel).

The pre-romanesque church of Saint Elias is located about 800 meter to the west of Donji Humac, and dates to the 10th century. On its side are the remains of a Roman mausoleum. Some of the ornaments of the mausoleum were used when building Saint Elias. The mausoleum has been called the most beautiful ancient monument on the island. Saint Elias has an apsis that is rectangular from the outside and a semi-circle from the inside. To the west of the church is the hill Trišćenik (Croatian trisk = thunder) - probably a not coincidental juxtaposition of the pagan thunder god with Saint Elias, who is known as the saint of thunder.

To the north of Donji Humac is the ruin of the church of Saint Luke, an early romanesque church from the 11th or 12th century. The inside of the church hosts the earliest known sketch of a boat in Croatian medieval art. Surrounding Saint Lucas are a number of stone sarcophagi that document the tradition of creating these since Roman times.

Saint Andrew, north east of the town, was built in the 13th or 14th century, on top of Roman ancient ruins. Its roof has since collapsed. Around Saint Andrew, a number of old Croatian earrings and 11th century Byzantine coins have been found. A number of old chronicles of Brač mention a Benedictine cloister in the area, but the cloister has not been found.

Demographic development 
As with most settlements on Brač, Donji Humac saw continuous growth since its settlement, gaining speed in the 19th century and reaching a height in the early 20th century - when particularly due to the grape phylloxera louse the local production of wine broke down. This destroyed many of the available local economic opportunities, and to a large wave of emigration. People from Donji Humac have moved to Antofagasta in Chile, Perth in Australia, Auckland in New Zealand, and the United States and later also Germany.

References
 

Brač
Populated places in Split-Dalmatia County